John Slayton may refer to:
 John W. Slayton, American socialist lecturer and politician
 John C. F. Slayton, American produce dealer and politician in Massachusetts

See also
 John M. Slaton, governor of Georgia